Stefania Prestigiacomo (born 16 December 1966) is an Italian politician, member of the centre-right political party Forza Italia and Member of the Chamber of Deputies of Italy from 1994 to 2022.

Biography
Stefania Prestigiacomo belongs to a family of Sicilian entrepreneurs. A former president of Region Sicily, Santi Nicita, is her uncle.

In 2006 she earned a First Level Degree in public administration at the Libera Università Maria SS. Assunta in Rome.

In 1990, she became the president of the Young Entrepreneurs Group of Syracuse, Sicily.

In 1994 she joined the Chamber of Deputies as member of the Forza Italia party. She was reelected in 1996, 2001, 2006, 2008.

In 2004, she was appointed as Minister for Equal Opportunities by Prime Minister Silvio Berlusconi. She was reappointed in that capacity in 2006. Between 2008 and 2011, she was Minister for Environment, Land and Sea.

Stefania Prestigiacomo has expressed support for the construction of new nuclear plants in Italy, a country with very limited reserves of fossil fuel and that currently imports (nuclear) electricity from France due to insufficient domestic capacity. She also authorized the drilling of off-shore oil wells in the Adriatic Sea in the proximity of Tremiti Islands, a natural maritime park.
 
She is President of the Inter-ministerial Coordination Committee for the fight against Paedophilia (CICLOPE). She is a Catholic.

Honors 
Commander of the Legion of Honor
- 2016

References

External links

 

1966 births
Living people
People from Syracuse, Sicily
Italian Roman Catholics
Forza Italia politicians
The People of Freedom politicians
Forza Italia (2013) politicians
Environment ministers of Italy
Deputies of Legislature XII of Italy
Deputies of Legislature XIII of Italy
Deputies of Legislature XIV of Italy
Deputies of Legislature XV of Italy
Deputies of Legislature XVI of Italy
Deputies of Legislature XVII of Italy
Deputies of Legislature XVIII of Italy
Politicians of Sicily
Women government ministers of Italy
20th-century Italian women politicians
21st-century Italian women politicians
Women members of the Chamber of Deputies (Italy)
Libera Università Maria SS. Assunta alumni